Beetree Hill is a mountain located in the Catskill Mountains of New York north-northeast of Wittenberg. Johns Mountain is located east, and Acorn Hill is located south-southeast of Beetree Hill.

References

Mountains of Ulster County, New York
Mountains of New York (state)